The Gandhi Series of banknotes are issued by the Reserve Bank of India (RBI) as the legal tender of Indian rupee. The series is so called because the obverse of the banknotes prominently display the portrait of Mahatma Gandhi. Since its introduction in 1996, this series replaced all Lion Capital Series banknotes issued before 1996. The Reserve Bank of India (RBI) introduced the series in 1996 with 10 and 500 rupee banknotes.

As of 10 November 2016, the RBI issues banknotes in this series in denominations from 5 to 100. Printing of five-notes, which had stopped earlier, restarted in 2009. On 8 November 2016, the 500 and 1000 banknote denominations of this series were demonetised and the new Mahatma Gandhi Series of banknotes were revealed in denominations of 500 and 2000, intended to replace this series.

Security features

The following features are included in the notes.
 Security thread: The notes contain an embedded security thread that can be seen as a vertical straight line when held against a light source. The notes contains the words 'Bharat' in Devanagari and RBI. The ₹1000 denomination contains the number 1000 as well. Older notes, however, are not readable.
 Latent image: When held against the light at an angle of 45 degrees, an inscription of the value of the denomination is seen on the right side of Mahatma Gandhi's image.
 Microlettering: Micro-letters are used to print RBI on ₹10 notes, and the value of the denomination on other notes.
 Intaglio print: 
 An intaglio (raised) shape is present on all denominations other than the ₹10 note to help the visually impaired. 
 20-Vertical rectangle
 50-Square
 100-Triangle
 500-Circle
 1,000-Diamond
 The image of Mahatma Gandhi, Reserve Bank of India seal, clause of guarantee, Ashoka Pillar emblem and signature of the governor of the Reserve Bank of India are all intaglio prints.
 Fluorescence: The number panels are printed with fluorescent ink.
 Optical fibre: The notes have optical fibres that glow when exposed to ultra-violet light.
 Optically variable ink: Denominations of ₹500 and ₹1000 are printed with ink that changes color with the angle of placement to light.
 See-through registration device – A floral design (later issues now have the corresponding denomination) printed on the front and the back of the note coincides and perfectly overlap each other when viewed against a light source.
 EURion constellation – A pattern of symbols found on the banknote helps software detect the presence of a banknote in a digital image so that it can prevent its reproduction with devices such as color photocopiers.
 Angular lines: A series of lines placed on both the left and right side of the 100, 500 and 1,000 notes. They are only featured on the 2015 series notes, and are utilised to help those with visual impairments in identifying the notes.
 Novel numbering: A set of six digit serial numbers that increase in size from left to right. Issued for the 2015 and 2016 series 20, 50, 100, 500 and 1,000 notes.

Banknotes

Languages 

Each banknote has its amount written in 17 languages. On the obverse, the denomination is written in Hindi and English. On the reverse is a language panel which displays the denomination of the note in 15 of the 22 official languages of India. The languages are displayed in alphabetical order. Languages included on the panel are Assamese, Bengali, Gujarati, Kannada, Kashmiri, Konkani, Malayalam, Marathi, Nepali, Odia, Punjabi, Sanskrit, Tamil, Telugu and Urdu.

See also
Mahatma Gandhi New Series
List of artistic depictions of Mahatma Gandhi

References

Memorials to Mahatma Gandhi
Banknotes of India
Portraits on banknotes